The 2021 Pan American Wrestling Championships was held in Guatemala City, Guatemala, from 27 to 30 May 2021.

Team ranking

Medal table

Medal summary

Men's freestyle

Men's Greco-Roman

Women's freestyle

References

External links
Official website
Results book

Pan American Wrestling Championships
Pan America
Pan American Wrestling Championships
Sports competitions in Guatemala City
Pan American Wrestling Championships
International wrestling competitions hosted by Guatemala